The 2012 season is Woodlands Wellington's 17th competitive and consecutive season in the top flight of Singapore football and 25th year in existence as a football club.

Key Dates
 1 January 2012: Club Captain Sazali Salleh leaves for Tampines Rovers after his second stint with Woodlands Wellington. Sazali played 54 times for the Rams between 2010 and 2011, and he has appeared a total of 158 times in total for Woodlands. In contrast, goalkeeper Ahmadulhaq Che Omar and defender Daniel Hammond rejoin Woodlands Wellington for the second time. Ahmadulhaq spent two seasons with Balestier Khalsa while Hammond joins the Rams from Geylang United.
 13 January 2012: Former Balestier Khalsa coach, Salim Moin, is appointed as the head coach of Woodlands Wellington following the departure of R. Balasubramaniam.
 24 March 2012: A goalless draw played out between Gombak United and Woodlands Wellington ends a three-game losing streak for the Rams.
 15 April 2012: A 2-1 loss to Harimau Muda in the Causeway Derby sees Woodlands Wellington embark on a five-game losing streak in the S-League. The match was particularly controversial as there was a total of four penalty kicks awarded in the game, with three awarded in favour of the Young Tigers. Woodlands custodian Ahmadulhaq Che Omar managed to keep Wan Zack Haikal's 37th minute spot kick out, but Gary Robbat and Affize Faisal made no mistake with their penalties to ensure that Harimau Muda emerged winners in a match laden with yellow cards and a sending off for Woodlands winger Goh Swee Swee.
 19 May 2012: Woodlands Wellington is knocked out of the RHB Singapore Cup following a 2–1 loss to Kanbawza FC in the first round. The match was played at Jalan Besar Stadium as Kanbawza FC was denoted as the home team.
 15 June 2012: Courts Young Lions and Woodlands Wellington agree on the transfer of Navin Neil Vanu. Neil is assigned jersey number 34 for the Rams.
  21 June 2012: Woodlands Wellington draws 1-1 with Geylang United at Bedok Stadium to arrest a five match losing streak. The match also saw Neil Vanu start his first game for Woodlands in 2012 upon his return to the Rams after his stint with the Courts Young Lions.
  11 July 2012: Referee Leow Thiam Hoe hands out 5 yellow cards to Woodlands in their 2-0 loss to Albirex Niigata (S), setting the current record for the most number of cards handed out to Woodlands Wellington in a single match during the 2012 season. The five yellow cards also meant that Woodlands would be slapped with an automatic fine of S$500 for receiving at least that many cautions in a single match, in accordance with league regulations.
  12 July 2012: The Starhub League Cup draw was made at Jalan Besar Stadium, and Woodlands was drawn into group D together with Tampines Rovers and Gombak United. The 2012 edition of the Cup, which will run from July 26 to August 11, 2012, will be played in a new format that will see four groups of three teams each battle it out for a place in the semi-finals. The four teams that finish third in their respective groups will also play in a separate Plate Competition consisting of two semi-finals and a final.
  20 July 2012: Woodlands Wellington sees their lowest attendance this season with only 277 fans attending their match against Balestier Khalsa. The match also resulted in Woodlands' third loss in a row after consecutive losses to Albirex Niigata (S) and Tampines Rovers before this match. Woodlands custodian Ahmadulhaq Che Omar makes his second penalty save of the season in the same match.
  30 July 2012: Woodlands Wellington draws their second game of the Starhub League Cup preliminary round with Gombak United and remain rooted to the bottom of Group D, leaving their fate of advancing to the quarter finals to be decided by the match between Gombak United and Tampines Rovers on 2 August.
  2 August 2012: Gombak United and Tampines Rovers draw their League Cup preliminary round match and both teams advance to the quarter-finals. Woodlands Wellington finish bottom of the Group D table and advance to the semi-finals of the newly created Plate Competition.
  6 August 2012: Woodlands Wellington crashes out of the League Cup Plate Competition after losing 1-0 to Balestier Khalsa in the semi-final, conceding a 67th goal to former Ram Zulkiffli Hassim.
  26 August 2012: Woodlands's 1-2 loss to Gombak United marks their 20th game of the season without a win.
  21 October 2012: Ahmadulhaq Che Omar's save against Ivan Jerković's penalty was his third penalty save of the season. The 1-2 loss against DPMM in the same match also meant that the Rams would finish the 2012 season as the wooden spoonists for the third season in a row.
  25 October 2012: The Rams pick up their fifth draw of the season, ending their match against Home United with a 0-0 scoreline following 3 consecutive losses against SAFFC, Harimau Muda and DPMM.
  4 November 2012: Woodlands Wellington's final match day 3-2 win over Tanjong Pagar United gets them only their third win of the season. All of the Rams' three goals were scored within the first 12 minutes of the match.

Team Kits

The team kits for 2012 were produced by Thai sports apparel maker, Acono.

Transfers

In

Pre-season

Mid-Season

Out

Pre-season

Mid-Season

Squads

First Team Squad

Club

Coaching staff
{|class="wikitable"
|-
|-
! Position !! Name
|-
|Team manager ||  Matthew Michael Tay
|-
|Head coach ||  Salim Moin
|-
|Assistant coach ||  Clement Teo
|-
|Goalkeeping coach ||  Matthew Michael Tay
|-
|Prime League Coach||  Marko Kraljević
|-
|Centre of Excellence Head Coach||  Mohd Sani Kadim
|-
|Centre of Excellence U16 Coach||  TM Sivarajan
|-
|Centre of Excellence U14 Coach||  Khairul Asyraf
|-
|Technical Consultant ||  Keith Tee Tan
|-
|Sports trainer ||  Billy Ang
|-
|Sports trainer ||  Gary Lee
|-
|Physiotherapist ||  Melissa Ng
|-
|Physiotherapist ||  Ratna Sari
|-
|Kitman ||  Wan Azlan Wan Adanan
|-

Boardroom Staff
{| class="wikitable"
|-
! Position !! Name
|-
|Chairman ||  Hussainar K. Abdul Aziz
|-
|Vice-Chairman ||  Winson Song Ying Kong
|-
|Honorary Treasurer ||  Keith Tee Tan
|-
|Club manager || Vacant
|-
|Operations executive ||  Joe Wong
|-
|Accounts Executive ||  Frances Chow
|-
|Accounts Executive ||  William Lam
|-

Pre-season and friendlies

S.League

S.League table

S.League results summary

S.League results by round

S.League Matches

RHB Singapore Cup

First round

Starhub League Cup

On 12 July 2012, Woodlands was drawn into Group D of the Starhub League Cup together with Tampines Rovers and Gombak United. The 2012 edition of the Cup, which will run from July 26 to August 11, 2012, will be played in a new format that will see four groups of three teams each battle it out for a place in the semi-finals. The four teams that finish third in their respective groups will also play in a separate Plate Competition consisting of two semi-finals and a final.

Woodlands loses their first Starhub League Cup preliminary round match to Tampines Rovers with a 3-1 defeat before drawing their second game with Gombak United and finished bottom of Group D, leaving their fate of advancing to the quarter finals to be decided by the match between Gombak United and Tampines Rovers on 2 August. Gombak United and Tampines Rovers drew their League Cup preliminary round match and both teams advance to the quarter-finals while Woodlands, as the bottom placed team of Group D table, advance to the semi-finals of the newly created Plate Competition to face Balestier Khalsa on 6 August 2012.

Woodlands Wellington crashed out of the League Cup Plate Competition on 6 August 2012 after losing 1-0 to Balestier Khalsa in the semi-final, conceding a 67th goal to former Ram Zulkiffli Hassim.

Group D

Preliminary round

Plate Competition Semi-Final

First Team Statistics

Appearances and Goals

|-

** Vincent Lee, Edward Tan and Aloysius Yap retired from professional football during the mid-season window.
*** Denotes Prime League players

First Team Goalscoring Statistics
Includes all competitive matches. The list is sorted by shirt number when total goals are equal.
{| class="wikitable" style="font-size: 95%; text-align: center;"
|-
!width=15|
!width=15|
!width=15|
!width=15|
!width=150|Name
!width=80|S-League
!width=80|RHB Singapore Cup
!width=80|Starhub League Cup
!width=80|Total
|-
|1
|10
|FW
|
|Moon Soon-Ho
|9
|1
|0
|10
|-
|rowspan="1"|2
|9
|FW
|
|Goh Swee Swee
|4
|0
|0
|4
|-
|rowspan="1"|3
|20
|MF
|
|Hussein Akil
|3
|0
|0
|3
|-
|rowspan="1"|4
|5
|DF
|
|Daniel Hammond
|1
|0
|1
|2
|-
|rowspan="3"|5
|7
|MF
|
|Guntur Djafril
|1
|0
|0
|1
|-
|13
|MF
|
|Aloysius Yap
|0
|0
|1
|1
|-
|19
|MF
|
|Oswind Suriya
|1
|0
|0
|1
|-
|colspan="4"|
|TOTALS
|19
|1
|2
|22

4 of Moon Soon-Ho's goals (3 in the S.League and 1 in the Singapore Cup) were scored via penalty kicks.

First Team Goal Assist Statistics
Includes all competitive matches. The list is sorted by shirt number when total assists are equal.
{| class="wikitable" style="font-size: 95%; text-align: center;"
|-
!width=15|
!width=15|
!width=15|
!width=15|
!width=150|Name
!width=80|S-League
!width=80|RHB Singapore Cup
!width=80|Starhub League Cup
!width=80|Total
|-
|rowspan="1"|1
|10
|FW
|
|Moon Soon-Ho
|6
|0
|1
|7
|-
|rowspan="1"|2
|9
|FW
|
|Goh Swee Swee
|3
|0
|0
|3
|-
|rowspan="2"|3
|5
|DF
|
|Daniel Hammond
|2
|0
|0
|2
|-
|6
|MF
|
|Armanizam Dolah
|2
|0
|0
|2
|-
|rowspan="1"|4
|3
|DF
|
|Duncan Elias
|0
|0
|1
|1
|-
|colspan="4"|
|TOTALS
|13
|0
|2
|15A total of 5 goals scored (4 in the S.League and 1 in the Singapore Cup) were not recorded with assists as they were scored either via penalty kicks or indirect free kicks.First Team Clean sheets
Includes all competitive matches. The list is sorted by shirt number when total clean sheets are equal.
{| class="wikitable" style="font-size: 95%; text-align: center;"
|-
!width=15| 
!width=15| 
!width=15|
!width=15|
!width=150|Name
!width=80|S-League
!width=80|RHB Singapore Cup
!width=80|Starhub League Cup
!width=80|Total
|-
|1
|1
|GK
|
|Ahmadulhaq Che Omar
|3
|0
|0
|3
|-
|colspan="4"|
|TOTALS
|3
|0
|0
|3

First Team Disciplinary record
Includes all competitive matches. The list is sorted by shirt number when total cards are equal.
{| class="wikitable" style="font-size: 95%; text-align: center;"
|-
| rowspan="2" style="width:2.5%; text-align:center;"|
| rowspan="2" style="width:3%; text-align:center;"|
| rowspan="2" style="width:3%; text-align:center;"|
| rowspan="2" style="width:3%; text-align:center;"|
| rowspan="2" style="width:12%; text-align:center;"|Name
| colspan="3" style="text-align:center;"|S-League
| colspan="3" style="text-align:center;"|RHB Singapore Cup
| colspan="3" style="text-align:center;"|Starhub League Cup
| colspan="3" style="text-align:center;"|Total
|-
! style="width:25px; background:#fe9;"|
! style="width:28px; background:#ff8888;"|
! style="width:25px; background:#ff8888;"|
! style="width:25px; background:#fe9;"|
! style="width:28px; background:#ff8888;"|
! style="width:25px; background:#ff8888;"|
! style="width:25px; background:#fe9;"|
! style="width:28px; background:#ff8888;"|
! style="width:25px; background:#ff8888;"|
! style="width:35px; background:#fe9;"|
! style="width:35px; background:#ff8888;"|
! style="width:35px; background:#ff8888;"|
|-
|1
|8
|MF
|
|Han Yiguang
|7
|1
|0
|0
|0
|0
|1
|1
|0
|8
|2
|0
|-
|2
|9
|FW
|
|Goh Swee Swee
|5
|1
|0
|0
|0
|0
|1
|0
|0
|6
|1
|0
|-
|3
|40
|DF
|
|Zulkarnain Malik
|1
|1
|0
|0
|0
|0
|0
|0
|0
|1
|1
|0
|-
|4
|18
|GK
|
|Ang Bang Heng
|0
|0
|1
|0
|0
|0
|0
|0
|0
|0
|0
|1
|-
|rowspan="1"|5
|17
|FW
|
|Farizal Basri
|5
|0
|0
|0
|0
|0
|1
|0
|0
|6
|0
|0
|-
|rowspan="2"|6
|3
|DF
|
|Duncan Elias
|5
|0
|0
|0
|0
|0
|0
|0
|0
|5
|0
|0
|-
|12
|DF
|
|K. Sathiaraj
|5
|0
|0
|0
|0
|0
|0
|0
|0
|5
|0
|0
|-
|rowspan="1"|7
|6
|MF
|
|Armanizam Dolah
|4
|0
|0
|0
|0
|0
|0
|0
|0
|4
|0
|0
|-
|rowspan="3"|8
|2
|DF
|
|Danny Chew
|2
|0
|0
|1
|0
|0
|0
|0
|0
|3
|0
|0
|-
|4
|DF
|
|Fabien Lewis
|3
|0
|0
|0
|0
|0
|0
|0
|0
|3
|0
|0
|-
|5
|DF
|
|Daniel Hammond
|3
|0
|0
|0
|0
|0
|0
|0
|0
|3
|0
|0
|-
|rowspan="2"|9
|7
|MF
|
|Guntur Djafril
|2
|0
|0
|0
|0
|0
|0
|0
|0
|2
|0
|0
|-
|20
|MF
|
|Hussein Akil
|2
|0
|0
|0
|0
|0
|0
|0
|0
|2
|0
|0
|-
|rowspan="6"|10
|1
|GK
|
|Ahmadulhaq Che Omar
|1
|0
|0
|0
|0
|0
|0
|0
|0
|1
|0
|0
|-
|10
|FW
|
|Moon Soon-Ho
|1
|0
|0
|0
|0
|0
|0
|0
|0
|1
|0
|0
|-
|13
|MF
|
|Aloysius Yap**
|1
|0
|0
|0
|0
|0
|0
|0
|0
|1
|0
|0
|-
|16
|DF
|
|Edward Tan**
|1
|0
|0
|0
|0
|0
|0
|0
|0
|1
|0
|0
|-
|19
|DF
|
|Vincent Lee**
|1
|0
|0
|0
|0
|0
|0
|0
|0
|1
|0
|0
|-
|34
|FW
|
|Navin Neil Vanu
|1
|0
|0
|0
|0
|0
|0
|0
|0
|1
|0
|0
|-
|colspan="4"|
|TOTALS
|50
|3
|1
|1
|0
|0
|3
|1
|0
|54
|4
|1
|-** Vincent Lee, Edward Tan and Aloysius Yap retired from professional football during the mid-season window.Prime League

Prime League Squad

Prime League Table

Prime League results by round

Prime League Matches* Match rescheduled due to the Singapore League Cup.Singapore Pools FA Cup* Both Prime League teams received automatic byes into the FA Cup Third Round.Prime League Appearances and Goals

|-* Vincent Lee and Edward Tan retired from football during the mid-season transfer window.''

Prime League Goalscoring Statistics
Includes all competitive matches. The list is sorted by shirt number when total goals are equal.
{| class="wikitable" style="font-size: 95%; text-align: center;"
|-
!width=15|
!width=15|
!width=15|
!width=15|
!width=150|Name
!width=80|Prime League
!width=80|FA Cup
!width=80|Total
|-
|rowspan="1"|1
|37
|FW
|
|Danial Tan Farhan
|6
|0
|6
|-
|rowspan="1"|2
|32
|MF
|
|Omar Ismail
|5
|0
|5
|-
|rowspan="2"|3
|27
|MF
|
|Andy Ahmad
|4
|0
|4
|-
|31
|MF
|
|Roihan Rashid
|4
|0
|4
|-
|rowspan="1"|5
|19
|MF
|
|Oswind Suriya
|3
|0
|3
|-
|rowspan="2"|6
|24
|FW
|
|Ali Razali
|2
|0
|2
|-
|35
|MF
|
|Zuraizi Saifollah
|2
|0
|2
|-
|rowspan="10"|7
|2
|DF
|
|Danny Chew
|1
|0
|1
|-
|9
|FW
|
|Goh Swee Swee
|1
|0
|1
|-
|7
|MF
|
|Guntur Djafril
|1
|0
|1
|-
|13
|MF
|
|Aloysius Yap
|1
|0
|1
|-
|22
|MF
|
|Farhan Hairoddin
|1
|0
|1
|-
|23
|DF
|
|Dinie Fitri
|1
|0
|1
|-
|26
|DF
|
|Mohd Haziq Durrani
|1
|0
|1
|-
|28
|DF
|
|Sidiq Abdullah
|1
|0
|1
|-
|33
|MF
|
|Imran Osman
|1
|0
|1
|-
|40
|DF
|
|Zulkarnain Malik
|1
|0
|1
|-
|colspan="4"|
|TOTALS
|36
|0
|36

One of Woodlands Wellington's goals was scored via an own goal by Basil Teo during the match against Geylang United on 2 June 2012.

Prime League Clean sheets
Includes all competitive matches. The list is sorted by shirt number when total clean sheets are equal.
{| class="wikitable" style="font-size: 95%; text-align: center;"
|-
!width=15| 
!width=15| 
!width=15|
!width=15|
!width=150|Name
!width=80|Prime League
!width=80|FA Cup
!width=80|Total
|-
|rowspan="2"|1
|30
|GK
|
|Fearghus Lyle Bruce
|4
|0
|4
|-
|39
|GK
|
|Abdul Qadir Yusoff
|4
|0
|4
|-
|rowspan="1"|2
|18
|GK
|
|Ang Bang Heng
|3
|0
|3
|-
|colspan="4"|
|TOTALS
|11
|0
|11
|-

Prime League Disciplinary record
Includes all competitive matches. The list is sorted by shirt number when total cards are equal.
{| class="wikitable" style="font-size: 95%; text-align: center;"
|-
| rowspan="2" style="width:2.5%; text-align:center;"|
| rowspan="2" style="width:3%; text-align:center;"|
| rowspan="2" style="width:3%; text-align:center;"|
| rowspan="2" style="width:3%; text-align:center;"|
| rowspan="2" style="width:12%; text-align:center;"|Name
| colspan="3" style="text-align:center;"|Prime League
| colspan="3" style="text-align:center;"|FA Cup
| colspan="3" style="text-align:center;"|Total
|-
! style="width:25px; background:#fe9;"|
! style="width:28px; background:#ff8888;"|
! style="width:25px; background:#ff8888;"|
! style="width:25px; background:#fe9;"|
! style="width:28px; background:#ff8888;"|
! style="width:25px; background:#ff8888;"|
! style="width:25px; background:#fe9;"|
! style="width:28px; background:#ff8888;"|
! style="width:25px; background:#ff8888;"|
|-
|1
|22
|MF
|
|Farhan Hairoddin
|9
|2
|0
|0
|0
|0
|9
|2
|0
|-
|rowspan="1"|2
|37
|FW
|
|Danial Tan Farhan
|2
|0
|1
|0
|0
|0
|2
|0
|1
|-
|rowspan="2"|3
|23
|DF
|
|Dinie Fitri
|7
|0
|0
|0
|0
|0
|7
|0
|0
|-
|24
|MF
|
|Ali Razali
|7
|0
|0
|0
|0
|0
|7
|0
|0
|-
|rowspan="1"|5
|28
|DF
|
|Sidiq Abdullah
|5
|0
|0
|0
|0
|0
|5
|0
|0
|-
|rowspan="2"|6
|35
|MF
|
|Omar Ismail
|4
|0
|0
|0
|0
|0
|4
|0
|0
|-
|36
|DF
|
|Mark Tan
|4
|0
|0
|0
|0
|0
|4
|0
|0
|-
|rowspan="1"|7
|27
|MF
|
|Andy Ahmad
|3
|0
|0
|0
|0
|0
|3
|0
|0
|-
|rowspan="7"|8
|8
|MF
|
|Han Yiguang
|2
|0
|0
|0
|0
|0
|2
|0
|0
|-
|12
|DF
|
|K. Sathiaraj
|2
|0
|0
|0
|0
|0
|2
|0
|0
|-
|13
|MF
|
|Aloysius Yap
|2
|0
|0
|0
|0
|0
|2
|0
|0
|-
|18
|GK
|
|Ang Bang Heng
|2
|0
|0
|0
|0
|0
|2
|0
|0
|-
|30
|GK
|
|Fearghus Lyle Bruce
|2
|0
|0
|0
|0
|0
|2
|0
|0
|-
|31
|FW
|
|Roihan Rashid
|2
|0
|0
|0
|0
|0
|2
|0
|0
|-
|40
|DF
|
|Zulkarnain Malik
|2
|0
|0
|0
|0
|0
|2
|0
|0
|-
|rowspan="10"|9
|2
|DF
|
|Danny Chew
|1
|0
|0
|0
|0
|0
|1
|0
|0
|-
|3
|DF
|
|Duncan Elias
|1
|0
|0
|0
|0
|0
|1
|0
|0
|-
|9
|FW
|
|Goh Swee Swee
|1
|0
|0
|0
|0
|0
|1
|0
|0
|-
|17
|MF
|
|Farizal Basri
|1
|0
|0
|0
|0
|0
|1
|0
|0
|-
|19
|MF
|
|Oswind Suriya
|1
|0
|0
|0
|0
|0
|1
|0
|0
|-
|25
|DF
|
|Nurhakim Kamsani
|1
|0
|0
|0
|0
|0
|1
|0
|0
|-
|26
|DF
|
|Haziq Durrani
|1
|0
|0
|0
|0
|0
|1
|0
|0
|-
|33
|MF
|
|Imran Osman
|1
|0
|0
|0
|0
|0
|1
|0
|0
|-
|35
|MF
|
|Zuraizi Saifollah
|1
|0
|0
|0
|0
|0
|1
|0
|0
|-
|39
|GK
|
|Abdul Qadir Yusoff
|1
|0
|0
|0
|0
|0
|1
|0
|0
|-
|colspan="4"|
|TOTALS
|65
|2
|1
|0
|0
|0
|65
|2
|1
|-

References

Woodlands Wellington
Woodlands Wellington FC seasons